Maluti TVET College is a South African football club based in Phuthaditjhaba, Free State that plays in the ABC Motsepe League.

The team represents the Maluti TVET College which has a number of campuses around the Free State, including Bethlehem, Bonamelo, Harrismith, Itemoheleng, Kwetlisong and Sefikeng.

History
The  team was founded in 2008 after the purchase of Vodacom League franchise Mathata Take Me Cool. Maluti caused one of the biggest shocks in South African cup football when they defeated Premier Soccer League team Orlando Pirates 4–1 in the 2012–13 Nedbank Cup first round.  Maluti won the 2012–13 SAFA Second Division Free State League and their national play-off group to win promotion to the National First Division.

They were relegated in the 2014–15 season.

Shirt sponsor & kit manufacturer
Shirt sponsor: None
Kit manufacturer: Adidas

References

External links
Premier Soccer Leag ue

Soccer clubs in South Africa
National First Division clubs
SAFA Second Division clubs
Association football clubs established in 2008
Soccer clubs in the Free State (province)
University and college association football clubs